Lujuria tropical is a 1962 Argentine erotic film directed by Armando Bó. It is considered a lost film.

Cast

References

External links
 

1962 films
1960s Spanish-language films
Argentine black-and-white films
Films directed by Armando Bó
Lost Argentine films
1960s lost films
1960s Argentine films